Teleamiga is a Colombian local television station, licensed by the Fundación Ictus and the La Gran Colombia University, based in Bogotá. It broadcasts family-oriented programmes, mostly with a Catholic stance.

In July 2017, the Episcopal Conference of Colombia issued an official statement against Teleamiga, in particular against its weekly program Un Café con Galat with the channel's founder and president Dr. José Galat who calls Pope Francis a "false pope", due to the involvement of the St. Gallen Group in his selection and has questioned the orthodoxy of his encyclicals. In Teleamiga's reply to the bishops' statement, Galat reiterated his position.

References

External links 
 Official website

Television networks in Colombia
Television channels and stations established in 2000
Spanish-language television stations
Mass media in Bogotá